Riverside is an unincorporated community and census-designated place in Stonycreek Township, Cambria County, Pennsylvania, United States. It is located just to the south of the city of Johnstown inside a bend formed by the Stonycreek River. As of the 2010 census, the population of Riverside was 381.

References

Census-designated places in Cambria County, Pennsylvania
Census-designated places in Pennsylvania